"I Can't Be Your Friend" is a song recorded by American country music band Rushlow.  It was released in April 2003 as the first single from their debut album Right Now.  The song was written by Brad Crisler and Rodney Clawson.

Music video
The music video was directed by Shaun Silva and premiered in late 2003.

Chart performance
"I Can't Be Your Friend" debuted at number 56 on the U.S. Billboard Hot Country Singles & Tracks chart for the week of May 10, 2003.

Year-end charts

References

2003 debut singles
2003 songs
Rushlow songs
Lyric Street Records singles
Music videos directed by Shaun Silva
Songs written by Rodney Clawson
Songs written by Brad Crisler